Ophiociliomyces is a genus of fungi within the Meliolaceae family.

References

External links
Ophiociliomyces at Index Fungorum

Meliolaceae